The 2004 Hawaii Democratic presidential caucuses were held on February 24 in the U.S. state of Hawaii as one of the Democratic Party's statewide nomination contests ahead of the 2004 presidential election.

Results

References 

Hawaii
Democratic caucuses
2004